Benha University is an Egyptian government university in the city of Benha, the capital of Al Qalyubiyah Governorate.

It was established according to a decree on 25 November 1976 as a branch from Zagazig University in Benha, with the faculties of Commerce, Education, Agriculture of Moshtohor, Engineering of Shobra and Medicine.

In 1981–1982, the faculties of Arts, Science of Benha and Veterinary Medicine of Moshtohor were founded. On 1 August 2005 it became an independent university from Zagazig University. The previous president of the university is Professor Hosam-ed-din Mohammad Al-Attar and then professor Mohamed Safwat Zahran, now Professor Ali Shams Aldeen.

See also
 Education in Egypt
 Egyptian universities
 List of Egyptian universities

References 
 Benha University - official web site

Universities in Egypt
Educational institutions established in 1976
1976 establishments in Egypt
Qalyubiyya Governorate